Ruen is the highest peak of the Osogovo range,  standing at 2,252 m. The peak is situated on the border between Bulgaria (Kyustendil Province) and North Macedonia (Makedonska Kamenica Municipality). Ruen is included in the 100 Tourist Sites of Bulgaria under No. 27. The main starting points for climbing are Osogovo hut, Three Beeches hotel and the village of Gyueshevo.

Citations

External links 

 
 

Two-thousanders of Bulgaria
Two-thousanders of North Macedonia
Landforms of Kyustendil Province
Tourist attractions in Kyustendil Province
International mountains of Europe
Bulgaria–North Macedonia border
Makedonska Kamenica Municipality
Osogovo